Podlubnik is part of a local community Podlubnik/Stara Loka in Municipality of Škofja Loka in the Upper Carniola region of Slovenia.

Fun fact: Podlubnik street has the second highest number of house numbers (356 house numbers) in whole Slovenia.

Podlubnik is divided into houses and 11 skyscrapers. 

There are also an elementary school and a high school.

A big problem in Podlubnik are teens that are trowing firecrackers. They are called Podlubnik Ghetto.

Škofja Loka